Francis Walter may refer to:

 Francis E. Walter, U.S. Representative from Pennsylvania
 Francis Walter (cross-country skier), British cross-country skier
 Frank Walter (Francis Archibald Wentworth Walter), Antiguan artist